Married to Jonas  was an American reality documentary television series on E! that debuted on August 19, 2012. It primarily focuses on Kevin Jonas, the eldest of the Jonas Brothers and his married life with his wife Dani Jonas. However, the first season also focused on the 2012 "comeback" of the Jonas Brothers.

In November 2012, E! announced that the series was renewed for a second season, which premiered April 21, 2013. The second season follows the couple as the Jonas Brothers finish their would-be fifth studio album and head back on their final United States tour after three years in hiatus, before the unexpected breakup of the band. Dani also jump-starts her own business endeavors by opening her own business in New Jersey and the Jonas and Deleasa families become closer. The show was cancelled after the end of the second season.

Cast

Main
 Kevin Jonas Jr.
 Danielle "Dani" Deleasa Jonas

Recurring

 Kevin Jonas Sr.
 Denise Jonas
 Joe Jonas
 Nick Jonas
 Frankie Jonas 
 Bucky Deleasa
 Angela Deleasa
 Dina Deleasa Gonsar
 Michael "Mikey" Deleasa
 Kathleen "Katie" Deleasa
 Brian Gonsar

Episodes

Series overview

Season 1 (2012)

Season 2 (2013)

Awards and nominations

References

External links

2010s American reality television series
2012 American television series debuts
2013 American television series endings
English-language television shows
Television series by Ryan Seacrest Productions
Television series based on singers and musicians
E! original programming
Documentaries about marriage